Karel Frantisek Jiri Hromadka (23 May 1905 – 30 March 1978) was a Czech ice hockey player. He competed in the men's tournaments at the 1928 Winter Olympics and the 1936 Summer Olympics.

His younger brother Eduard was an international alpine skier.

References

External links
 

1905 births
1978 deaths
Czech ice hockey forwards
Ice hockey players at the 1928 Winter Olympics
Ice hockey players at the 1936 Winter Olympics
Olympic ice hockey players of Czechoslovakia
Ice hockey people from Prague
People from the Kingdom of Bohemia
Czechoslovak ice hockey forwards
Czechoslovak ice hockey coaches
Czechoslovak emigrants to the United States